is a city located in Shimane Prefecture, Japan. It is the third largest city in the prefecture and is located at the southwestern end of the prefecture. It is a coastal city on the Sea of Japan and possesses beautiful white sand beaches, which make the city a popular destination for local tourists in the summer. Hamada is a small city around 1 hour 40 minutes by expressway to Hiroshima. The city was founded on November 3, 1940.

On October 1, 2005, the towns of Asahi, Kanagi and Misumi, and the village of Yasaka (all from Naka District) were merged into Hamada. Therefore, Naka District was dissolved as a result of this merger.

As of March 2017, Hamada City has an estimated population of 57,142, with roughly 43,000 people living in the coastal urban 'city' area.

The prefectural university (The University of Shimane) is located in Hamada, as is the Institute for Northeast Asian Research.

Hamada is one of the few cities in the region to possess a heavy tonnage shipping port. The Hamada commercial port can accept vessels up to a maximum of .1

Geography

Climate

Hamada has a humid subtropical climate (Köppen climate classification Cfa). It experiences a wide range in temperature between summer and winter but due to its location it is saved from the extreme winter cold in the north and prolonged summer heat in the south. The coastal main city of Hamada occasionally gets snowfall in the winter. The mountainous areas of Hamada inland to the east receive high levels of snowfall and are home to some of the best ski resorts in the area. Late spring/early summer is the rainy season with frequent light showers throughout the day. Spring and Autumn in Hamada provide warm, sunny weather with a very comfortable temperature.

Due to its location on the western seaboard of Japan, Hamada is relatively free from weather extremes such as typhoons or flooding. Hamada is also not located near a fault line and the occurrence of strong earthquakes in Shimane is rare.

Demographics
Per Japanese census data, the population of Hamada in 2020 is 54,592 people. Hamada has been conducting censuses since 1920.

Education

Hamada has 26 elementary schools, 9 junior high schools and 3 senior high schools throughout the city area.

Tourism

Sights
 Aquas is on the outskirts of the city. It is the largest aquarium in western Honshū.
 The Hamada Museum of Children's Art is located about one mile from the city center. Its exhibits include artwork by children from around the world and artwork of interest to children. Their programs include technical art classes and art history workshops for children of all ages.
 The ruins of Hamada castle are situated on the top of a hill near the centre of town. Hamada Castle was built in 1620, and destroyed towards the end of the Tokugawa Shogunate. From the top of the ruins, visitors can see extensive views of Hamada city and the coast.
 Iwami Seaside Park is a large beach located near Aquas with cabins, barbecue areas, and rental facilities.

Culture

Yearly festivals

International relations

Twin towns — Sister cities
Hamada is twinned with:

  Shizuishan, China
  Pohang, South Korea

References

External links

 Hamada City official website . (There is an English page link from the Japanese page, but it has less information.)
 University of Shimane 
 Hamada International Association homepage  (slightly out of date)
 Hamada Port Authority 
 Aquas Aquarium  English version available.
 Iwami Seaside Park  About the park and its facilities.

Cities in Shimane Prefecture
Port settlements in Japan
Populated coastal places in Japan